"Windy" is a song recorded by the Danish band Scarlet Pleasure. It was released on February 26, 2014, as their first official single, after an unsuccessful trip to the United States. They took back to Denmark to find success, and after just a few weeks on the Danish charts, "Windy" won the prize as P3's Uundgåelige. The song is Produced by David Mørup, Mixed by Rune Rask and Mastered by Brian Gardner, who has mastered songs for Dr. Dre, David Bowie, Eminem and many more.

Charts 
The song reached No. 26 in the Tracklisten, the Danish Singles Chart, after release on Copenhagen Records / Universal Music.

References 

Scarlet Pleasure songs
2014 singles
2014 songs
Copenhagen Records singles